The Cayratieae is one of five tribes of vine plants that are now recognised in this subfamily Vitoideae.  It contains genera restored or newly erected from species in the previously configured genus Cayratia, which was found not be monophyletic: (i.e. distinct from Cayratia pedata: the type species of that genus).

Genera
 Acareosperma Gagnep. - Laos
 Causonis Raf. - Tropical & Subtropical Asia to SW Pacific
 Cayratia Juss. - Tropical & Subtropical Africa & Asia to W Pacific
 Cyphostemma (Planch.) Alston - Tropical & S Africa to Indochina
 Pseudocayratia J.Wen, L.M.Lu & Z.D.Chen - E Asia: Japan to Vietnam
 Tetrastigma (Miq.) Planch. - Tropical & Subtropical Asia to SW Pacific

References

External links
 

Rosid tribes 
Vitaceae